Nagachandra or Abhinava Pampa was a 12th-century poet in the Kannada language.

Biography
Nagachandra, a scholar and the builder of the Mallinatha Jinalaya (a Jain temple in honor of the 19th Jain tirthankar, Māllīnātha, in Bijapur, Karnataka), wrote Mallinathapurana (1105), an account of the evolution of the soul of the Jain saint. According to some historians, King Veera Ballala I was his patron.

Works
He wrote his magnum opus, a Jain version of the Hindu epic Ramayana called Ramachandra Charitapurana (or Pampa Ramayana). Written in the traditional champu metre and in the Pauma charia tradition of Vimalasuri, it is the earliest extant version of the epic in the Kannada language. The work contains 16 sections and deviates significantly from the original epic by Valmiki. Nagachandra represents King Ravana, the villain of the Hindu epic, as a tragic hero, who in a moment of weakness commits the sin of abducting Sita (wife of the Hindu god Rama) but is eventually purified by her devotion to Rama. In a further deviation, Rama's loyal brother Lakshmana (instead of Rama) kills Ravana in the final battle. Eventually, Rama takes jaina-diksha (converts to Digambara monk), becomes an ascetic and attains nirvana (enlightenment). Considered a complementary work to the Pampa Bharatha of Adikavi Pampa (941, a Jain version of the epic Mahabharata), the work earned Nagachandra the honorific "Abhinava Pampa" ("new Pampa"). Only in the Kannada language do Jain versions exist of the Hindu epics, the Mahabharata and Ramayana, in addition to their Brahminical version.

Notes

Sources
 

12th-century Indian Jain poets
Indian male poets
People from Bijapur, Karnataka
Poets from Karnataka